The 12173 / 74 Lokmanya Tilak Terminus–Pratapgarh Udyognagri Express is a Superfast Express train belonging to Indian Railways – Central Railway zone that runs between Lokmanya Tilak Terminus and Pratapgarh in India.

It operates as train number 12173 from Lokmanya Tilak Terminus to Pratapgarh  and as train number 12174 in the reverse direction, serving the states of Maharashtra, Madhya Pradesh and Uttar Pradesh.

The name Udyognagri means Industrial City (initially this train was introduced between Mumbai and industrial and commercial capital of Uttar Pradesh, Kanpur) .

Coaches

The 12173 / 74 Lokmanya Tilak Terminus–Pratapgarh Udyognagri Express has 1 AC 2 tier, 3 AC 3 tier, 12 Sleeper Class, 4 General Unreserved & 2 SLR (Seating cum Luggage Rake) Coaches. In addition, it carries a pantry car  .

As is customary with most train services in India, coach composition may be amended at the discretion of Indian Railways depending on demand.

Service

As the average speed of the train is above , as per Indian Railways rules, its fare includes a superfast surcharge.

Routing

Traction

As sections of the route are yet to be fully electrified, until January 2014  a Kalyan based WCAM-3  hauled the train from Lokmanya Tilak Terminus until  handing over to a Bhusawal-based WAP-4 until  after which a Lucknow-based WDM-3A would power the train for the remainder of its journey.

With Central Railways progressively moving towards a complete changeover from DC to AC traction, it is now hauled by a Bhusaval-based WAP-4 or WAM-4  from Lokmanya Tilak Terminus until  after which a Lucknow-based WDM-3A powers the train for the remainder of its journey.

Operation

12173 Lokmanya Tilak Terminus–Pratapgarh Udyognagri Express runs from Lokmanya Tilak Terminus every Tuesday & Sunday at 04:25 PM, reaching Pratapgarh Junction the next day at 06:55 PM

12174 Pratapgarh–Lokmanya Tilak Terminus Udyognagri Express runs from Pratapgarh Junction every Tuesday & Thursday at 01:50 AM, reaching Lokmanya Tilak Terminus at 06:00 AM, the next day.

References 

 http://www.irfca.org/gallery/Events/cracdcjan13/
 https://www.youtube.com/watch?v=70UBVOFsLL8
 http://www.mumbaiblogs.in/2014/05/late-running-udyog-nagri-exp-crawls-through-diva-jn/
http://www.irfca.org/faq/faq-name.html

External links

Transport in Mumbai
Express trains in India
Rail transport in Maharashtra
Rail transport in Madhya Pradesh
Rail transport in Uttar Pradesh
Transport in Pratapgarh, Uttar Pradesh
Named passenger trains of India